A Force of One is a 1979 American action martial arts film starring Chuck Norris, Jennifer O'Neill, Ron O'Neal, Clu Gulager and Bill Wallace. The film was directed by Paul Aaron and written by Pat E. Johnson and Ernest Tidyman and released by American Cinema Productions.

Plot

When a team of undercover narcotics officers is targeted by a serial killer, the police recruit karate champion Matt Logan to bring the murders to an end. Narcotics officer Amanda "Mandy" Rust (Jennifer O'Neill) discovers that a traitor within the police ranks is behind the killings.

Cast

Chuck Norris as Matt Logan
Jennifer O'Neill as Amanda "Mandy" Rust
Clu Gulager as Dunne
Ron O'Neal as Rollins
Bill Wallace as Sparks
Eric Laneuville as Charlie Logan
James Whitmore Jr as Moskowitz
Clint Ritchie as Melrose 
Pepe Serna as Orlando 
Ray Vitte as Newton
Taylor Lacher as Bishop
Lisa James as Harriett
Chu Chu Malave as Rudy
Kevin Geer as Johnson
Eugene Butler as Murphy
Mel Novak as The Announcer
Kevin Geer as Johnson
Karen Obediear as Alice

Reception

Critical response
Todd McCarthy of Variety wrote, "Though plot is far-fetched and production values aren't much superior to tv fare, likable protagonists and strong karate sequences will carry the day with the intended audience." Kevin Thomas of the Los Angeles Times called it "a swift, taut, handsomely photographed thriller... made with more craftmanship than most martial arts movies." Gene Siskel of the Chicago Tribune gave the film two stars out of four and dismissed it "just a poor excuse for a lot of fighting." K.C. Summers of The Washington Post wrote, "It's pretty good. Not only does it move along at a faster clip than many a higher-budget film, but it's done without a lot of gore — no small feat in a martial arts movie ... Another plus is that the romantic leads, Jennifer O'Neill and Chuck Norris, actually seem to like one another; they're relaxed and at ease before the camera, and their scenes together are a pleasure to watch."

Norris said he was "ten times better in" the film than in his previous film Good Guys Wear Black (1978).

The film was written by Ernest Tidyman who in a 1980 interview considered it his least successful effort as a craftsman. "I only wrote it to buy my mother a house." he said, although financially it was one of his biggest hits.

See also
 Chuck Norris filmography

References

External links
 
 
 

1979 films
American action films
1979 action films
American police detective films
American independent films
American martial arts films
1979 martial arts films
Martial arts tournament films
1979 independent films
Films directed by Paul Aaron
1970s English-language films
1970s American films